The 2017–18 CB Miraflores season was the third in existence and their debut in the Liga ACB, the top flight of Spanish basketball, of this club, called San Pablo Burgos for sponsorship reasons.

Overview
After several disappointments of different teams from the city of Burgos, that could not meet the requirements for promoting, San Pablo Burgos was finally admitted in the Liga ACB on 14 July 2017. As consequence of this and due to the requirement of the league to play in an arena of at least 5,000 seats, the club moved from Polideportivo El Plantío to the renovated bullring Coliseum Burgos.

The club made their debut on 1 October 2017, but they were defeated 65–81 at home by Iberostar Tenerife. After a streak of seven consecutive losses, including the matches against four of the five EuroLeague teams, the first win arrived on 11 November 2017 by beating UCAM Murcia at the Coliseum by 89–86.

On 3 December 2017, San Pablo Burgos won their first match away, against RETAbet Bilbao Basket by 62–78. Twenty days later, the team achieved the third win, the second one away, after beating direct rivals Divina Seguros Joventut by 81–88, thus allowing the club to remain at a distance of only one win for avoiding the relegation positions.

On 14 January 2018, and after earning two consecutive wins at MoraBanc Andorra and against Real Betis Energía Plus, after an overtime, San Pablo Burgos left for the first time in the season the relegation positions. Deon Thompson, with a Performance Index Rating of 31 in the second of these matches, was named MVP of the week. The streak would continue with a new win at Pabellón Príncipe Felipe, by defeating Tecnyconta Zaragoza with a 9/9 of Sebas Saiz.

San Pablo Burgos did not came back and ended the season with 13 wins in 34 matches, remaining in the ACB without options to be relegated since the 31st round.

Players

Squad information

In

|}

Out

|}

Club

Technical staff

Competitions

Liga ACB

League table

Results summary

Results by round

Matches

Statistics

Source: ACB

References

External links
 Official website

Miraflores
CB Miraflores seasons